The Ulysses Fossae are a group of troughs in the Tharsis quadrangle of Mars at 10.06° north latitude and 123.07° west longitude.  They were named after an albedo feature name. The area contains pitted cones called Ulysses Colles which were interpreted to be possible Martian equivalents to terrestrial cinder cones.

See also

 Fossa (geology)
 Geology of Mars

References 

Tharsis quadrangle
Valleys and canyons on Mars